Quah Zheng Wen  (born 29 September 1996) is a Singaporean professional swimmer who specialises in individual medley, backstroke, butterfly and freestyle events.

Education
Quah was educated at Anglo-Chinese School (Independent) and had achieved 43 points out of a possible 45 for his IB Diploma. 

After completed his IB Diploma Programme, Quah was accepted into the Yong Loo Lin School of Medicine at the National University of Singapore, but chose to defer his studies. He subsequently went on to enrol at the University of California, Berkeley in 2017, before graduating in 2021.

Swimming career
In June 2012, he set a national record in the 200 m individual medley. At the 2012 Summer Olympics he finished 33rd overall in the heats in the Men's 400 metre individual medley and failed to reach the final. Quah was Singapore's flag bearer for the 2013 Asian Youth Games. He won three individual gold medals and a silver medal at the 200 m backstroke, 200 m butterfly, 200 m individual medley and 200 m freestyle events respectively. He won the team silver and bronze medals at the 4 × 100 m freestyle relay and 4 × 100 m medley relay events.

At the 2015 Southeast Asian Games held in Singapore, Quah took part in 12 events, winning seven golds, four silvers and a bronze. He broke six Games records – three individual and three relays. In the men's 4 × 100 m medley relay which consisted of Quah, Joseph Schooling, Clement Lim and Lionel Khoo, the team finished the race in 3:38.25, erasing the old record of 3:41.35 set in 2011.

At the 2016 Rio Olympics, Quah achieved a personal best time in 200 meters butterfly in the heats. He was the first male Singaporean to qualify for a semifinal berth at an Olympics swim competition. He is one of two Singaporean male swimmers to have qualified for two semi-final berths at the Olympics.

Due to his potential at winning Olympic medals for Singapore, Quah was granted National Service (NS) deferment until the 2020 Olympic Games. Due to the COVID-19 pandemic, the 2020 Olympic Games was delayed to 2021 and his NS deferment was extended to 2021.

In the 2020 Olympic Games, Quah competed in the 100m butterfly, the 200m butterfly and the 100m backstroke. He failed to clock personal best times and did not make it to the semi-finals for the three events.

Quah returned to Singapore after a 5-year programme at the University of California, Berkeley, and is currently serving his National Service. However, Quah noted that he was “at a crossroads of some big life decisions” and desires to continue swimming.

Personal life
Quah has an elder sister, Quah Ting Wen, and a younger sister, Quah Jing Wen, who both are national swimmers of Singapore as well.

References

External links
 
 
 
 
 

Singaporean male backstroke swimmers
Singaporean male butterfly swimmers
Singaporean male freestyle swimmers
1996 births
Living people
Swimmers at the 2012 Summer Olympics
Swimmers at the 2016 Summer Olympics
Swimmers at the 2020 Summer Olympics
Olympic swimmers of Singapore
Singaporean male medley swimmers
Singaporean sportspeople of Chinese descent
Swimmers at the 2014 Commonwealth Games
Commonwealth Games competitors for Singapore
Swimmers at the 2018 Asian Games
Asian Games bronze medalists for Singapore
Medalists at the 2018 Asian Games
Southeast Asian Games medalists in swimming
Southeast Asian Games gold medalists for Singapore
Southeast Asian Games silver medalists for Singapore
Southeast Asian Games bronze medalists for Singapore
Asian Games medalists in swimming
Competitors at the 2011 Southeast Asian Games
Competitors at the 2013 Southeast Asian Games
Competitors at the 2015 Southeast Asian Games
Competitors at the 2017 Southeast Asian Games
Competitors at the 2019 Southeast Asian Games
Competitors at the 2021 Southeast Asian Games
California Golden Bears men's swimmers
Anglo-Chinese School alumni
University of California, Berkeley alumni
Swimmers at the 2022 Commonwealth Games